Talisia is a genus of 52 species of flowering plants in the family Sapindaceae, native to tropical regions of the Americas. The genus is closely related to Melicoccus, with some species sometimes included in that genus.

The species are evergreen trees and shrubs growing to 20 m tall, with pinnate leaves. The flowers are individually inconspicuous, produced in panicles. The fruit is an oval drupe 2–4 cm long containing one or two seeds surrounded by a translucent crisp, juicy layer of fruit pulp and a thin orange or brown skin; in several species the fruit pulp is edible.

Selected species

References

Flora of Bolivia checklist: Talisia
Field Museum: Talisia herbarium index

 
Sapindaceae